Drum Rock is an insular rock in the Argentine Islands, Graham Coast, rising  above sea level on the eastern edge of the Forge Islands, between Smooth Island and Grotto Island. The name is descriptive of the shape of the rock and became established through local usage at the British Antarctic Survey Faraday Station during the 1980s.

References 

Rock formations of Graham Land
Graham Coast